Caswell Developmental Center is a center for adults with intellectual disabilities and other developmental disabilities in Kinston, North Carolina, United States. The Center started in 1911 and is still operating today.

Caswell Center Museum
Exhibits at the Caswell Center Museum & Visitors Center focus on the history of the center, the quality of life of its residents, and the development of the medical care and treatment they received.

References

External links
Caswell Developmental Center
Caswell Developmental Center - History

Education in North Carolina
Museums in Lenoir County, North Carolina
Medical museums in the United States
History museums in North Carolina
Buildings and structures in Lenoir County, North Carolina
Hospitals in North Carolina